= Albert of Belgium =

Albert of Belgium may refer to:

- Albert I of Belgium (1875–1934), reigned as King of the Belgians from December 23, 1909, to February 17, 1934
- Albert II of Belgium (born 1934), his grandson, reigned as King of the Belgians from August 9, 1993, to July 21, 2013
